The 2019 Kate Sheppard Cup is New Zealand's women's 25th annual knockout football competition. This is the second year that the competition is known by the Kate Sheppard Cup, or New Zealand Football Foundation Kate Sheppard Cup for sponsorship purposes, after previously been known as the Women's Knockout Cup since its establishment.

The 2019 competition has three rounds before quarter-finals, semi-finals, and a final. Competition will run in three regions (northern, central/capital, southern) until the quarter-finals, from which stage the draw will be open. In all, 40 teams entered the competition.

Results

Round 1
All matches were played on the weekend of 11–12 May 2019.

Central/Capital Region

Mainland Region

Southern Region

All teams listed below received byes to the second round.
Northern Region: Hibiscus Coast, Forrest Hill Milford United, Glenfield Rovers, Waitemata, Warkworth, Three Kings United, Central United, Ellerslie, Eastern Suburbs, Western Springs, Bucklands Beach, Papakura City, Onehunga Sports, Waiuku, Claudelands Rovers, Hamilton Wanderers.
Central/Capital Region: Palmerston North Marist, Wairarapa United, Seatoun, Western Suburbs, Wellington United.
Mainland Region: Nelson Suburbs.
Southern Region: Dunedin Technical, Green Island.

Round 2
All matches were played on Queen's Birthday weekend 31 May - 3 June 2019.

Northern Region

Central/Capital Region

Mainland Region

Southern Region

* Match defaulted by Warkworth.

Round 3
All matches were played on the weekend 15–16 June 2019.

Northern Region

Central/Capital Region

Mainland

Southern Region

Quarter-finals
All matches were played on the weekend 6–7 July 2019.

Northern Region

Central/Capital Region

Mainland/Southern Region

Semi-finals
Matches were played on the weekend 24–25 August 2019.

Final
The final was played on the 8 September 2019 and saw Eastern Suburbs win their first Kate Sheppard Cup as well as completing a league-cup double after earlier winning the Northern Region Football League's premier women's division. The final was played at North Harbour Stadium before the men's Chatham Cup final. This was Eastern Suburbs's third finals appearance, having lost twice previously in 2005 and 2017. It was also Coastal Spirit third appearance however while they lost in their first appearance in 2011, they had won the cup before in 2013 in a final that was played at home in Christchurch.

An early goal to Suburbs inside the first five minutes to Hannah Pilley was quickly followed up by Tayla O'Brien in the ninth. Pilley got her second in the 25th minute and by that stage Suburbs was controlling the game. O'Brien got her second in the 35th minute which saw Suburbs go into the half up four nil. Suburbs controlled the second half and while they had a few more chances they also kept Coastal scoreless, leaving the final score the half time score. Tayla O’Brien was jointly awarded the Maia Jackman trophy for the most valuable player with Suburbs fullback Erinna Wong.

References

External links
Women's knockout cup section on the New Zealand Football website

Women's Knockout Cup/Kate Sheppard Cup
Women's Knockout Cup
Women's Knockout Cup
New Zealand, Kate Sheppard Cup
New Zealand, Kate Sheppard Cup
Kate Sheppard Cup
September 2019 sports events in New Zealand